The Crawling Hand is a 1963 American science fiction horror film directed by Herbert L. Strock, and starring Peter Breck, Kent Taylor, Rod Lauren, Alan Hale and Allison Hayes. It was later featured on the television shows Mystery Science Theater 3000 (MST3K) and The Canned Film Festival.

Plot
An astronaut, coming in for a crash landing, makes odd statements over the radio, including "my hand... makes me do things.... kill.... kill!" Strangely, by then, ground control was under the belief that he was already out of oxygen. Later, a naive young med student, Paul, discovers a disembodied hand near the crash site and takes it home as a grisly souvenir. He is not aware that the hand is possessed by a strange, murderous alien. First, the hand murders Paul's landlady. The police, led by a sheriff played by Alan Hale, begin to suspect Paul, especially as he begins to act more and more strangely as the hand begins to have more and more influence over him.   The fictional federal agency responsible for space flight is called to the small town because fingerprints found at the first crime scene match the missing, dead astronaut. Paul, now under control of the arm, attacks other people around the town, including his own beloved girlfriend. Horrified at what he's been doing, Paul attempts to take the arm to the beach to destroy it, but he's confronted by the authorities. The arm, now wounded, is held down by some cats who try to eat it. Authorities collect the arm, and Paul, recovering in the hospital, appears to be forgiven. The orderlies charged with transporting the captured arm to the airport for transport to the federal agency open the box containing the arm, and the film ends with a quick zoom to the inside of the box and the sound of a scream as the words "the end" appear on black.

Cast 
Peter Breck as Steve Curan
Kent Taylor as Dr. Max Weitzberg
Rod Lauren as Paul Lawrence
Alan Hale as Sheriff Townsend
Allison Hayes as Donna
Sirry Steffen as Marta Farnstrom
Arline Judge as Mrs. Hotchkiss
Richard Arlen as Lee Barrenger
Tristam Coffin as Security Chief Meidel
Ross Elliott as Deputy Earl Harrison
G. Stanley Jones as Funeral Director
Jock Putnam as Ambulance Attendant
Andy Andrews as Ambulance Attendant
Syd Saylor as Soda Shop Owner
Ed Wermer as Prof. Farnstrom
Beverly Lunsford as Patsy Townsend
Les Hoyle

Note: character names are not indicated in on-screen credits.

Home video
 The Crawling Hand was featured in Episode 6 of Season 1 of the TV series Mystery Science Theater 3000. This episode was released on VHS by Rhino Home Video in October 1999 and on DVD in June 2002, including the uncut film as a bonus feature.

In other media
Rick Moody's novel The Four Fingers of Death, released in July 2010 by Little, Brown and Company, is a metafictional novelization of a 2025 remake of The Crawling Hand (which means that Moody's fictional 'novelization' is set in a future very different from that of the 1963 film).

References

External links

Mystery Science Theater 3000 
 
 Episode guide: 106- The Crawling Hand

1963 films
1963 horror films
1960s science fiction horror films
American science fiction horror films
American black-and-white films
Films directed by Herbert L. Strock
1960s monster movies
Films set in California
1960s English-language films
1960s American films